A presidential referendum in Haiti was held on 30 April 1961 alongside parliamentary elections. Voters were asked whether President François Duvalier should remain in office for a further six years. The official count was 1,320,748 votes in favor of Duvalier and none against.  The New York Times wrote that "Latin America has witnessed many fraudulent elections throughout its history but none has been more outrageous than the one which has just taken place in Haiti."

Results

References

President
Elections in Haiti
Haiti
Initiatives and referendums in Haiti
Election and referendum articles with incomplete results